Heart, Mind and Soul is the debut Japanese studio album (third overall) by South Korean pop group Tohoshinki, released on March 22, 2006, by Rhythm Zone. It was released in two physical versions: a CD only version, which includes bonus tracks; and a CD+DVD version, which includes a track list of PVs. The album debuted on the Oricon Albums Chart at number 22, selling 18,000 copies.

Track listing

Release version side notes 
CD only version contains a 24-page booklet

Release history

Charts and sales

Oricon sales charts (Japan)

Korea yearly foreign albums & singles

Singles

References

2006 albums
TVXQ albums
Avex Group albums
2006 video albums
Avex Group video albums
Japanese-language albums